A viral regulatory and accessory protein is a type of viral protein that can play an indirect role in the function of a virus.

An example is Nef.

References

Further reading
 

Viral proteins